(The Beautiful Galatea) is an operetta in one act by Franz von Suppé to a German libretto by the composer and 'Poly Henrion' (the pseudonym of Leonhard Kohl von Kohlenegg).* 

In the early 1860s, French operettas by Jacques Offenbach were first presented in Vienna. Franz von Suppé was obliged to compete with them by taking the time-honored traditions of Vienna and combining it with the new style of Offenbach. Die schöne Galathée was Franz von Suppé's first critical success.

Performance history
It was given in London at the Opera Comique, on 6 November 1871, and in New York at the Stadt Theater on 6 September 1867.

Roles and role creators
Galathée (Galatea) (soprano) Ämilie Kraft
Ganymed (Ganymede) (mezzo-soprano) Anna Grobecker
Mydas (Midas) (baritone) Karl Treumann
Pygmalion (tenor) Telek

Synopsis

The sculptor Pygmalion has fallen madly in love with his statue of Galathée and accordingly does not want to sell it to Mydas, a patron of the arts. Instead he prays to Venus, the goddess of the love, that the statue be brought to life. The wish is granted but Galathée turns out to be a very independent-minded creature. She is unfaithful to Pygmalion with his servant Ganymed (because he is much more pleasing to her than Pygmalion) and does not reject Mydas, who offers her jewelry. When Pygmalion catches Galathée in a compromising situation, he successfully implores Venus to turn her back into stone. The jewelry offered by Mydas is also turned into stone, but the whole statue is sold to him.

References

External links
 
 Musical Theatre Guide page, accessed 7 June 2010
 Klassika page, accessed 7 June 2010

German-language operettas
Operas by Franz von Suppé
1865 operas
Operas
Operas set in Cyprus
Operas based on Metamorphoses
Works based on Pygmalion from Ovid's Metamorphoses